Bridelia is a plant genus of the family Phyllanthaceae first described as a genus in 1806. It is widespread across Africa, Australia, southern Asia, and various islands of the Indian and Pacific Oceans.

Bridelia species are used as food plants by the larvae of some Lepidoptera species including Endoclita malabaricus.

The genus Bridelia was named in the honor of Samuel Elisée Bridel-Brideri by the German botanist Carl Ludwig Willdenow.

Species
, Plants of the World Online accepted the following species:

 Bridelia adusta – Sarawak, Sabah
 Bridelia affinis – Yunnan, Hainan, Thailand
 Bridelia assamica – Arunachal Pradesh, Assam, Bangladesh
 Bridelia atroviridis – tropical Africa
 Bridelia balansae – Nansei-shoto, S China, Indochina, Taiwan
 Bridelia brideliifolia – E + C + SE Africa
 Bridelia cathartica – C + S Africa
 Bridelia cinnamomea – Andaman Is, S Thailand, Malaysia, W Indonesia
 Bridelia curtisii – Andaman & Nicobar, Indochina, Sumatra
 Bridelia duvigneaudii – C Africa
 Bridelia eranalis – Zaïre
 Bridelia erapensis – Papua New Guinea
 Bridelia exaltata – Queensland, New South Wales
 Bridelia ferruginea – tropical Africa
 Bridelia finalis – Queensland
 Bridelia fordii Hemsl. – S China to Hainan
 Bridelia glauca – S + SE + E Asia, Papuasia
 Bridelia grandis – W + C Africa
 Bridelia harmandii – Indochina
 Bridelia insulana – SE Asia, Papuasia, Queensland, Micronesia
 Bridelia leichhardtii – Queensland
 Bridelia macrocarpa – Maluku, New Guinea
 Bridelia micrantha – tropical – S Africa, Réunion
 Bridelia microphylla – Somalia
 Bridelia mollis – southern Africa
 Bridelia montana – India
 Bridelia moonii – Sri Lanka
 Bridelia ndellensis – C Africa
 Bridelia nicobarica – Nicobar Islands
 Bridelia oligantha – Papua New Guinea 
 Bridelia ovata Decne. – Indo-China to W. Malesia
 Bridelia parvifolia – Hainan, Vietnam
 Bridelia pervilleana – Madagascar
 Bridelia pustulata – Malaysia, Sumatra, Borneo, Philippines
 Bridelia retusa – S China, S + SE Asia
 Bridelia rhomboidalis – Madagascar
 Bridelia ripicola – C Africa
 Bridelia scleroneura – Yemen, tropical Africa
 Bridelia sikkimensis – Himalayas
 Bridelia somalensis – Somalia
 Bridelia speciosa – W Africa
 Bridelia stipularis – S + E + SE Asia
 Bridelia taitensis – Kenya
 Bridelia tenuifolia – Angola, Namibia
 Bridelia tomentosa – S + E + SE Asia, New Guinea, Australia
 Bridelia triplocarya – Papua New Guinea
 Bridelia tulasneana – Madagascar
 Bridelia verrucosa – NE India, Himalayas
 Bridelia whitmorei – Pahang
 Bridelia wilksii – Gabon

Formerly included
Moved to other genera (Aporosa, Cleistanthus, Damnacanthus, Phyllanthus, Scleropyrum).

References

 
Phyllanthaceae genera